Elprice was an electronics retailer in Norway. Now bankrupt.

As of 2010, Elprice had 24 stores in Norway, in addition to the Internet store, Elprice.no. It was founded in 2000, and has its headquarters in Bergen. In 2008 it was merged with the Internet store Deal, as Deal's owner Holta Invest bought 98% of the shares.

References

External links
Official website

Consumer electronics retailers
Retail companies of Norway
Retail companies established in 2000
Companies based in Bergen